Heptagrotis was a genus of moths of the family Noctuidae. The only species, Heptagrotis phyllophora is now known as Lycophotia phyllophora.

References
Natural History Museum Lepidoptera genus database
Heptagrotis at funet

Noctuinae